Hillsboro Gap, also known as the Gap in the Short Hill is a water gap in the Short Hill Mountain formed by the North Fork of the Catoctin Creek in Loudoun County, Virginia.  The gap derives its name from the town of Hillsboro, which is nestled in the gap.  Virginia State Route 9 passes through the gap in the town.

In colonial times the main road between Alexandria and Winchester, Vestal's Gap Road, passed through the gap.  That road eventually became the Charles Town Pike and modern day Route 9.  The gap poses a substantial barrier to the widening of the congested road as the historic town completely fills the gap and as such Route 9 would have to be routed around or over the Short Hill Mountain to be widened.

References
Scheel, Eugene. Loudoun Discovered: Communities, Corners and Crossroads. Vol. 5, 2002, pp. 28–30.

Water gaps of Virginia
Blue Ridge Mountains
Landforms of Loudoun County, Virginia